Arca is a genus of saltwater clams in the family Arcidae, the ark clams.

Description
As is typical for ark clams, species in this genus have a long, straight hinge line. Some species in this genus, such as Arca zebra and Arca noae, have a brown-and-white striped pattern. Arca attach themselves to rock with byssal threads which protrude through a gap on the ventral (open) side.

Species
Species within the genus Arca include:

Arca acuminata Krauss, 1848
Arca angulata King & Broderip, 1832
Arca avellana Lamarck, 1819 - hazelnut ark 
Arca boucardi Jousseaume, 1894 - Kobelt's ark 
Arca bouvieri Fischer, 1874
Arca despecta Fischer, 1876
Arca imbricata Bruguière, 1789 - mossy ark 
Arca kauaia (Dall, Bartsch & Rehder, 1938)
Arca koumaci Lutaenko & Maestrati, 2007
Arca maculata Sowerby
Arca mauia
Arca mutabilis (Sowerby I, 1833) - changeable ark 
Arca navicularis Bruguière, 1789 - Indo-pacific ark 
Arca noae Linnaeus, 1758 - Noah's ark 
Arca ocellata Reeve, 1844
Arca pacifica (Sowerby I, 1833) - Panamic turkey wing 
Arca patriarchalis Röding, 1798
Arca reticulata Gmelin, 1791
Arca tetragona Poli, 1795 - four-sided ark 
Arca truncata Sowerby
Arca turbatrix Oliver & Cosel, 1993
Arca ventricosa Lamarck, 1819 - ventricose ark 
Arca volucris Reeve, 1844
Arca zebra (Swainson, 1833) - Atlantic turkey wing

References

Arcidae
Bivalve genera